Dame Elizabeth Cadbury School is a coeducational secondary school and sixth form located in the Bournville area of Birmingham, West Midlands, England. The school was named after Dame Elizabeth Cadbury.

The school was established in 1955, and the author and folklorist Roy Palmer was headmaster of the school from 1972 to 1983. Later, the school gained specialist status as a Technology College and was renamed Dame Elizabeth Cadbury Technology College.

Previously a foundation school administered by Birmingham City Council, in October 2016 Dame Elizabeth Cadbury Technology College converted to academy status and was renamed Dame Elizabeth Cadbury School. The school is now sponsored by the Matrix Academy Trust.

The sixth form provision is offered as part of the 'Oaks Sixth Form College', a consortium of 7 secondary schools in South-West Birmingham.

References

External links 
School website

Academies in Birmingham, West Midlands
Secondary schools in Birmingham, West Midlands
Educational institutions established in 1955
1955 establishments in England